The Yarriambiack Creek, an inland intermittent watercourse of the Wimmera catchment, is located in the Wimmera region of the Australian state of Victoria.

Name
The name of the creek is thought to derive from Jarambuik, the name of a sub-group
of the indigenous Wotjobaluk people; also once spelt Yarriambiac, Yarramberger and Yarrambeak.

Location and features

The flow of the watercourse is intermittent and depends almost entirely on the level of the Wimmera River. After not flowing for most of the previous 15 years, it flooded in September 2010 and January 2011. Water was released from the Wimmera River in 2012 and flowed through the creek and ended in Warracknabeal. There are a number of weirs built along the creek to hold water. The Yarriambiack Creek descends  over its  course.

At Warracknabeal,  and Hopetoun there are picnic spots, camping areas, gardens and walking trails.

The creek is crossed by the Henty Highway at multiple points between Warracknabeal and Hopetoun.

See also

References

Mallee catchment
Wimmera catchment
Rivers of Grampians (region)
Wimmera
Distributaries